Samuel Whittingham may refer to:

 Sir Samuel Ford  Whittingham (1772–1841), a Lieutenant-General in the British Army who fought in the Napoleonic Wars and in India afterwards.
 Sam Whittingham (footballer) (1884 – unknown), an English footballer. He was the elder brother of Bob Whittingham

See also
Whittingham (surname)